Lowman is a small unincorporated rural census-designated place in the western United States, located in Boise County, Idaho. As of the 2010 census, its population was 42.

History 
The community was named for a homesteader, Nathaniel Winfield Lowman, from Polk County, Iowa, who settled there in 1907.

Lowman is notable for having a one-room school, one of only a couple hundred still in use in the United States.

Geography 
 from Boise on State Highway 21, the "Ponderosa Pine Scenic Byway," Lowman is at the junction with the  "Banks-Lowman Highway"; now designated Highway 2512A.

The trail winds from 8th Street in Boise and climbs the Boise River, past the Lucky Peak Dam. The road descends over  then climbs to Beaver Creek Summit and switches back down to Lowman.

Lowman is in a geothermally active region; natural hot springs surface in the middle of the community as well as in many other places in the surrounding mountains.

Climate
This climatic region is typified by large seasonal temperature differences, with warm to hot (and often humid) summers and cold (sometimes severely cold) winters. According to the Köppen Climate Classification system, Lowman has a humid continental climate, abbreviated "Dfb" on climate maps.

Notable residents 
Gordon Bess, cartoonist of Redeye
Robin Fontes returned to Idaho after a military career, retired a Major General

Transportation
 - SH-21 - to Idaho City and Boise (south) and Stanley (north)

References

External links
Roadside historical marker in Lowman

Census-designated places in Boise County, Idaho
Census-designated places in Idaho